The 1878 Connecticut gubernatorial election was held on November 5, 1878. Republican nominee Charles B. Andrews defeated Democratic incumbent governor Richard D. Hubbard with 46.66% of the vote.

As no candidate had won a majority of the vote, the Republican-controlled state legislature elected Andrews, who had received a plurality.

General election

Candidates
Major party candidates
Charles B. Andrews, Republican
Richard D. Hubbard, Democratic

Other candidates
Charles Atwater, Greenback
Jesse G. Baldwin, Prohibition

Results

References

1878
Connecticut
Gubernatorial